Ristić (Cyrillic script: Ристић) is a Serbian surname. Notable people with the surname include:

Mihailo Ristić (born 1995), Serbian footballer
Bratislav Ristić (born 1980), Serbian footballer
Dragutin Ristić (born 1964), Croatian footballer
Jovan Ristić (1831–1899), Serbian statesman
Nevena Ristić (born 1990), Serbian actress
Sreto Ristić (born 1976), Serbian footballer
Stevica Ristić (born 1982), Macedonian footballer
Aleksa Ristić (born 1998), Serbian Basketball player
Svetlanka Ristic, fictional character in the Australian soap opera Neighbours

You may be looking for 
 Ristic - Reissue record label controlled by John R. T. Davies

Serbian surnames